Shenzhen Kejian Group Co., Ltd., better known as Kejian, was a Chinese telecommunications company.

During the 2002–03 FA Premier League season, the company sponsored Everton F.C.

Kejian was responsible for the club's signing of Chinese international players Li Tie and Li Weifeng.

The company went bankrupt in 2013. The shares of the listed subsidiary of Kejian: China Kejian Co., Ltd. were distributed to creditor such as China Orient Asset Management and China Cinda Asset Management in the same year. The former subsidiary is now known as China Tianying after a reverse IPO in 2013.

References 

Display technology companies
Electronics companies of China
Chinese brands
Mobile phone manufacturers
Telecommunications equipment vendors
China Orient Asset Management
Companies that have filed for bankruptcy in the People's Republic of China